Primrose is a suburb of  Germiston in Ekurhuleni, Gauteng, South Africa.

References

Germiston
Populated places in Ekurhuleni